B40, B-40, or B.40 may refer to:

Roads 
 Autovia B-40, a Spanish motorway in Catalonia
 Bundesstraße 40, a German road

In Science 
 Borospherene, B40, an allotropic cage-like molecule of pure boron
 HLA-B40, an HLA-B serotype

Military 
 Vietnamese designation of the RPG-2, the first rocket-propelled grenade launcher designed in the Soviet Union
 BSA B40, a 350cc British motorcycle
 Blackburn B.40, an experimental Blackburn flying boat
 Rolls-Royce B40 Engine, an inline-four petrol engine primarily used in the Austin Champ
 Unterseeboot B-40, World War I Imperial Germany Navy submarine U-boat
 YB-40 Flying Fortress, an aircraft

Other 
 40 amp, type B – a standard circuit breaker current rating
 Sicilian Defence, Encyclopaedia of Chess Openings code